Tyler Dylan Madden (born February 21, 2000) is an American professional baseball pitcher in the Detroit Tigers organization. He was selected 32nd overall in the 2021 Major League Baseball draft by the Tigers. He played college baseball for the Texas Longhorns.

Amateur career
Madden grew up in Cypress, Texas, and attended Cypress Ranch High School. He was rated a top-100 collegiate recruit and high school prospect for the MLB Draft and initially committed to play college baseball at Rice before switching his commitment to Texas going into his senior year. Madden was selected in the 34th round of the 2018 MLB Draft by the Kansas City Royals but opted not to sign with the team.

Madden pitched in 15 games with eight starts as a freshman, posting a 4–1 record with 3.40 ERA and 37 strikeouts in 42.1 innings pitched. After the 2019 season, he played collegiate summer baseball with the Chatham Anglers of the Cape Cod Baseball League. As a sophomore, he served as the Longhorns' Saturday starter and went 3–0 with a 1.80 ERA in four starts before the season was cut short due to the coronavirus pandemic. Madden entered his redshirt sophomore season on the watchlist for the Golden Spikes Award and a preseason All-American by multiple outlets, as well as a top pitching prospect in the upcoming draft. Madden was named first team All-Big 12 and the Conference Pitcher of the Year after posting a 7-5 record with a 2.45 ERA and 137 strikeouts in  innings over 18 starts.

Professional career
Madden was selected by the Detroit Tigers with the 32nd overall pick of the 2021 Major League Baseball draft. He signed with the Tigers on July 19, 2021 for a $2.5 million bonus.

Madden made his professional debut in 2022 with the West Michigan Whitecaps.

References

External links

Texas Longhorns bio

2000 births
Living people
Sportspeople from Harris County, Texas
Baseball players from Texas
Baseball pitchers
Texas Longhorns baseball players
Chatham Anglers players
People from Cypress, Texas
West Michigan Whitecaps players